Placodiscus boya is a species of plant in the family Sapindaceae. It is found in Côte d'Ivoire and Ghana. It is threatened by habitat loss.

References

boya
Vulnerable plants
Taxonomy articles created by Polbot
Taxa named by François Pellegrin
Taxa named by André Aubréville